The following organizations have been called International Foundation:

 al-Aqsa International Foundation, a charity with alleged ties to the Palestinian militant organization Hamas
 Benevolence International Foundation, a purported nonprofit charitable trust based in Saudi Arabia
 Gaddafi International Charity and Development Foundation, an international non-governmental organization (NGO) with headquarters in the Libyan capital Tripoli and offices in Chad, Germany, the Philippines, and Sudan
 Gandhi Memorial International Foundation, a.k.a. Mahatma Gandhi International Foundation, a controversial non-profit organization run by Yogesh K. Gandhi, born Yogesh Kothari, who claims to be related to Mahatma Gandhi
 International Foundation for Art Research, created a database that led to the Art Loss Register
 International Foundation for Civil Liberties, a non-profit organization and political pressure group established by Russian tycoon Boris Berezovsky
 International Foundation for Electoral Systems, provides assistance for elections in new and emerging democracies
 International Foundation for Gender Education, American non-profit transgender advocacy organization devoted to "overcoming the intolerance of transvestitism and transsexualism brought about by widespread ignorance"
 International Foundation for Human Rights and Tolerance, a human rights group affiliated with Scientology
 International Foundation for Protection Officers, a non-profit organization to address training and certification of security officers and their supervisors
 International Foundation for Science
 IslamIFC (Islamic International Foundation of Cooperation), a nonprofit, non-governmental organization that partners with North American Muslims, non-Muslims, and organizations to promote mutual understanding and cultural exchange
 Oasis International Foundation, a foundation to promote knowledge and understanding between Christians and Muslims, with  focus on Christian minorities in Muslim countries
 Osho International Foundation, an organization that propagates the views of the Rajneesh movement, a religious movement founded by Indian guru and mystic Osho
 Reggio Children - Loris Malaguzzi Centre Foundation, to promote education and research
 Singapore International Foundation, a not-for-profit organization that seeks to nurture active global citizens and friends for Singapore
 Talif International, an international non-profit and charitable Foundation headquartered in Kannur, India
 The Fellowship (Christian organization) or The Family, a Christian political organization